Leonard Bertie James Pidduck (January 1926 – 10 February 2014) was a British wrestler. He competed in the men's Greco-Roman heavyweight at the 1948 Summer Olympics.

References

External links
 

1926 births
2014 deaths
British male sport wrestlers
Olympic wrestlers of Great Britain
Wrestlers at the 1948 Summer Olympics
Sportspeople from Dover, Kent